The 1938 United States Senate election in Illinois took place on November 8, 1938. Incumbent first-term Democrat William H. Dieterich retired. Fellow Democrat Scott W. Lucas was elected to succeed him.

Election information
The primaries and general election coincided with those for House and those for state elections.

Primaries were held April 12, 1938.

Democratic primary

Candidates
Michael L. Igoe, United States Attorney for the Northern District of Illinois and former U.S. congressman
Newton Jenkins, perennial candidate
Albert Lagerstedt
Scott W. Lucas, U.S. congressman
John J. Sullivan

Results

Republican primary

Candidates
William J. Baker
Richard J. Lyons, U.S. congressman
Clarence P. Parker

Results

General election

See also
1938 United States Senate elections

References

1938
Illinois
United States Senate